Seyed Ali Mousavi Noor  (Persian: سید علی موسوی نور, born 7 March 2006) is an Iranian karateka. He won the men's 70-weight committee gold medal at the Asian Games in Kazakhstan.

Kazakhstan Asian Games 2021 
In 2021, Seyed Ali Mousavi Noor was sent to the Asian Games in Kazakhstan as a member of the national team. Asian championship platform After taking a break in the first round, Seyed Ali Mousavi Noor defeated Alexander Morozov from Kyrgyzstan in the second round with a score of 3-1. In the next round, he defeated Hasan al-Majadi from Kuwait with a score of 4-1 and went to the final stage. In the final match, Mousavi beat Abdullah Al-Qahtani from Saudi Arabia with a score of 0-0 (5-0 in Hanti) and won the gold medal.

Achievements

Gallery

References

External links 

Living people
Year of birth missing (living people)
Place of birth missing (living people)
Iranian male karateka
Islamic Solidarity Games medalists in karate
Islamic Solidarity Games competitors for Iran
21st-century Iranian people
Asia
Iran
Ramhormoz County
Karate
Karateka